Mokretsov is a surname. Notable people with the surname include:

Ilya Mokretsov (born 1984), Russian and Kazakh sabre fencer
Mikhail Mokretsov (born 1961), Russian businessman and state official

See also
Mokretsevo, a village in Vologda Oblast in Russia

Russian-language surnames